"Summit" is a song by Josh Gabriel, released as a single/EP in 2007 and reaching number 2 in the buzz chart. It includes remixes by Gabriel himself, Christopher Norman and Dusty Kid. It was exclusively released on Beatport on November 15,  and was available on iTunes Store from November 29. This is the tenth release from Gabriel & Dresden's label, Organized Nature, and Gabriel's third single/EP after "Wave 3" (Nebula Recordings) and "Alive".

Track listing
 Summit
 Summit (Christopher Norman Remix)
 Summit (Dusty Kid Pseudotek Remix)
 Summit (Josh Gabriel Remix)
 Summit (Dusty Kid Rouge Re-Edit)

Release history

Official artist reviews

References
http://www.ruckus.com/
 http://www.progressive-sounds.com/
http://requiem4adream.wordpress.com/

2007 singles
Josh Gabriel songs
Songs written by Josh Gabriel
2007 songs